The National Museum of Brazil collections included an exhibition of fossils.

The current status of the collection is unknown after the fire that destroyed the museum in September 2018.

See also 

 National Museum of Brazil

References

Bibliography 
 

 
Museu Nacional
Museu Nacional